Patrick Robert Norman Appleford (1925–9 December 2018) was an English Anglican priest and hymnwriter.  Along with Geoffrey Beaumont and others he was a founder of the "Twentieth Century Church Light Music Group" around 1960, which  significantly affected the development of hymn-writing and hymn-singing across English-speaking churches from that time onwards.

Appleford found his vocation to the priesthood at Trinity College, Cambridge, where Beaumont was chaplain. He studied for the ministry at Chichester and served his first curacy at All Saints Poplar, in the East End of London from 1952-8.  He then served as chaplain of Bishops' College, Cheshunt (1958–61).  From 1961 to 1966 he served with USPG, then moved to Lusaka, Zambia as Dean and Rector of Cathedral of the Holy Cross until 1972.  On his return to England he was curate-in-charge of Sutton St Nicholas with Sutton St Michael (1973–75), then Chelmsford Diocesan Director of Education (1975–90) and Canon of Chelmsford Cathedral (1978–90).

Music
His hymn "Lord Jesus Christ (Living Lord)", for which he wrote both music and text, is found in at least seventeen hymnals worldwide and has been translated into several languages.

The music of his "New English Mass" set the emerging modern-language English texts of the Church of England communion service for congregational accessibility, establishing a trend which has been followed by many other composers of liturgical music.

References

External links
 Biographical entry at Canterbury Dictionary of Hymnology

1925 births
2018 deaths
20th-century Church of England clergy
Alumni of Trinity College, Cambridge
Members of Anglican religious orders
Church of England hymnwriters
20th-century English composers